The Baeksang Arts Award for Best Supporting Actress – Film is an award presented annually at the Baeksang Arts Awards ceremony organised by Ilgan Sports and JTBC Plus, affiliates of JoongAng Ilbo, usually in the second quarter of each year in Seoul.

Winners and nominees

1970s

2010s

2020s

References

Sources

External links 
  

Baeksang Arts Awards (film)
Film awards for supporting actress